Eivind Saxlund (1858 – 10 December 1936) was a Norwegian lawyer and writer. He was a barrister by occupation, and worked cases brought before the Supreme Court of Norway. However, he is better known for his contributions to anti-Semitic literature. He published the pamphlet of Theodor Fritsch Jøder og Gojim ("Jews and Goyim") in 1910, translated it and wrote a preface, in Det 20de Århundre, with new editions published in 1911, 1922 and 1923. He also contributed to Mikal Sylten's anti-Semitic magazine Nationalt Tidsskrift, both financially and with articles.

Together with Anna Magdalene Sundt (1863–1950), Eivind Saxlund had a son, Alf Eivind Saxlund, who also became a barrister.

Saxlund died in late 1936, before Norway became occupied by Nazi German (1940–1945).

Author
Wurzellose Rasse. (in German; i. e. "Rootless Race" sc. the Jews) in the anthology Die Weltfront. Eine Sammlung von Aufsätzen antisemitischer Führer aller Völker. (i. e. "The worldwide front. A collection of essays written by antisemitic leaders from all the people of the world.") Ed. Hans Krebs. Weltfrontverlag, Aussig 1926, p. 43-47 online

References

1858 births
1936 deaths
19th-century Norwegian lawyers
Norwegian writers
20th-century Norwegian lawyers